Alaeddin Tabrizi or spelled Ala' al-Din Tabrizi (Persian: علاء الدين تبريزي ) was a royal master calligrapher who was active during the reign of the Safavid ruler Shah Tahmasp (r. 1524-76), for whom he executed royal decrees (firmans). He executed a number of inscriptions placed on buildings in the cities Tabriz, Qazvin and Karbala.

References

 Safwat 1996: 84-88 and cat. no. 43, and 134-5, cat. no. 65; 
 Huart 1972, 103; 
 Qadi Ahmad 1959, 79)

External links 
A CALLIGRAPHIC PANEL

16th-century calligraphers of Safavid Iran
Year of birth missing
Year of death missing
Calligraphers from Tabriz
16th-century Iranian painters